Mayme P. Watts, aka Maymie Watts, was an American songwriter and R&B singer. Watts is best known for co-writing the jazz standard "Alright, Okay, You Win" with Sid Wyche. Watts also co-wrote (with Robert Mosely) the charting songs "Give Me Your Love" and Midnight Flyer" by Nat King Cole, "Since I Made You Cry" by The Rivieras, "Point of No Return" by Adam Wade, and "Ooh! What a Day!", recorded by both Craig Douglas and Sarah Vaughan.

Watts was a vocalist with the Lionel Hampton Orchestra. She also recorded singles as a solo artist as well as in the duo Mayme & Robert.

In March 1958, Watts married Ralph Sawyer in Germany. In August 1959, Watts filed a lawsuit against former Mercury Records executive Brad Shad, for songwriting royalties she believed were owed to her from “Alright, Okay, You Win”. By the mid-1960s she was performing as a vocalist with the Walter Davis Jr. Trio, and married pianist Walter Davis.

Discography 
As Maymie Watts (solo)
 Quicksand / There Goes That Train (Groove 4G-0103, 1955)
 Doo Ba Dee (Track 23, Rockin' the Groove, Bear Family BCD 17412, 2016) 
 Wheel of Time (Track 35, Rockin' The Groove, Bear Family BCD 17412, 2016) 
With Mayme & Robert / Maymie and Robert
 Ain't No Way in the World / Parting Tears (Glory 45-260, 1957)
 Sweet Lips / Ha Ha Hee Hee Ho Ho Hum Hum (MGM K12702, 1958) 
 You Ought to Know /  That's When (Roulette R-4347, 1961)

References

20th-century American composers
Year of birth missing
Year of death missing